Moss is a 2010 South Korean mystery thriller film directed by Kang Woo-suk. It was based on the popular webtoon of the same title by Yoon Tae-ho.

Plot
In a small town in South Korea, a corrupt detective named Cheon is asked by a church minister to arrest an unofficial street preacher, whose influence has been growing, and who has collected large donations. The donors are pressured into saying that they were defrauded, which leads to the preacher's imprisonment and subsequent torture by Cheon in order to extract a confession. To Cheon's surprise, the preacher demonstrates amazing endurance and will-power, leading Cheon to release him and to fund his preaching. Cheon uses their new-found friendship to bolster his own reputation and recruit henchmen. Around this time, a young girl named Lee is raped by three men, and Cheon earns her respect by beating them up.

Around 25 years later, Ryoo, the estranged son of the preacher, is anonymously informed of his father's death and travels to the town, which happens to be the new jurisdiction of his acquaintance Park, a prosecutor. Ryoo encounters an elderly Cheon, whom all the townsfolk seem to venerate and fear. With Cheon are three henchmen, Jeon, Ha, and Kim, and also Lee, who became Cheon's wife.

After the funeral, Ryoo stays behind to investigate, as he suspects his father was murdered, and finds several clues such as suspicious real-estate transactions. At this point, Jeon attempts to murder Ryoo, but Ryoo fights back and kills him. Ha attempts to murder Ryoo, who resists by lighting Ha's house on fire. Lee sees this and rescues Ryoo, and minutes later Ha burns to death, having entered the burning house to rescue his valuables.

As it turns out, Cheon has been serially extorting townspeople for their land, which he re-sells, and he has murdered anyone who didn't cooperate. Owing to his political connections, the police never indict him. Additionally, a mass poisoning occurred at a prayer house during this period, leaving dozens dead, and the culprit was never caught. Park, having spoken with Ryoo, builds a case against Cheon over the opposition of his corrupt superiors, and the last henchman Kim agrees to testify.

Sadly, Cheon eaves-drops on the conversation and has Kim murdered. Ryoo angrily confronts Cheon, who reveals that Ryoo's father, upon realizing the extent of Cheon's corruption, attempted to murder Cheon in his sleep. Lee, fortunately, agrees to testify and to hand over evidence. She explains that years ago she had opposed a tentative plan to dispose of Ryoo's father, and in retaliation, Cheon's three henchmen had raped her.

As the town is raided by police, Ryoo, Park, and Lee confront Cheon at his house. Cheon is outraged that Lee betrayed him, and what is more, they argue over who did the prayer-house massacre. Cheon claims that Ryoo's father did it, while Lee claims that Cheon did it. In the midst of the raid, Cheon's son attempts to burn the evidence, and accidentally kills himself. As the police try to arrest Cheon, he shoots himself in the head, which brings the case to a close, though Ryoo's father's death goes unexplained.

A year later, Ryoo visits his father's grave, and discovers that Lee has become the leader of the town. He suddenly recalls the anonymous phone call, as well as the convenient placement of clues, and realizes, to his horror, that Lee was his father's murderer. Having been tortured by Cheon, and wishing for an escape, Lee poisoned Ryoo's father so that Ryoo would arrive and open an investigation, the one which finally brought about Cheon's defeat.

Cast
 Park Hae-il as Ryoo Hae-kook
 Jung Jae-young as Cheon Yong-deok, the village head
 Yoo Jun-sang as Park Min-wook, a public prosecutor
 Yoo Sun as Lee Yeong-ji, a village resident
 Yoo Hae-jin as Kim Deok-cheon, a village head
 Kim Sang-ho as Jeon Seok-man, a village resident
 Kim Joon-bae as Ha Seong-kyoo, a village resident
 Heo Joon-ho as Ryoo Mok-hyeon, Hae-kook's father
 Kang Shin-il as a district prosecutor
 Im Seung-dae as Mr. Cheon, a village police officer
 Jeong Gyoo-soo as a principal
 Lee Cheol-min

Production
The film was shot in Muju County, North Jeolla Province.

International release
The film was picked up for distribution in the UK by Inclusionism Films. The DVD release featured extensive interviews with both the film's director and comic artist Yoon Tae-ho.

Awards and nominations

References

External links
  
 Moss at Naver 
 
 
 

2010 films
2010s mystery thriller films
South Korean mystery thriller films
Films based on South Korean webtoons
Films directed by Kang Woo-suk
2010s Korean-language films
Live-action films based on comics
2010s South Korean films